The Hanapepe River is a river on the Hawaiian island of Kauai. The watershed covers an area of 27.7 square miles, draining roughly a twentieth of the island. The name Hanapepe translates to "crushed bay," which may refer to landslides in the area.

The river drains the fertile Hanapepe Valley, a region that was historically used for growing rice, taro, coffee, and sugarcane. During the late 19th and early 20th centuries, the valley attracted Chinese, Japanese, Korean, and Filipino immigrant workers, many of whom started their own farms or businesses. More recently, the Hanapepe Valley was used for filming parts of the 1993 Steven Spielberg film Jurassic Park.

Near its mouth in Hanapepe, the river passes under the Hanapepe Swinging Bridge. The footbridge was built in 1911 to provide Hanapepe residents with a way to cross the river, and was restored in 1992 after Hurricane Iniki. Considered a local tourist attraction, the bridge is popular with children due to its tendency to rock back and forth.

References 

Rivers of Kauai